Omar Andrés Fernández Frasica (born 11 February 1993) is a Colombian professional footballer who plays as a winger for Liga MX club Puebla on loan from León.

He is married since January 2018 (or Winter 2017) with his long time girlfriend and mother of his children, Andrea. He has got two sons Dylan Andrés and Thiago Andrés, who were born before marriage with his wife, then girlfriend. On 12.02.2022, he announced that he will be dad for the 3rd time. In May, he announced the gender and name of his third child, Isabella

Honours
León
Leagues Cup: 2021

References

External links 
 
 
 

1993 births
Living people
Colombian footballers
Association football forwards
Colombian expatriate footballers
Colombian expatriate sportspeople in Mexico
Colombian expatriate sportspeople in Peru
Expatriate footballers in Mexico
Expatriate footballers in Peru
Liga MX players
Peruvian Primera División players
Academia F.C. players
Llaneros F.C. players
Club Puebla players
FBC Melgar footballers
People from Zipaquirá